Dolphin Reef is a horseshoe-shaped sea-pen where bottlenose dolphins in the Gulf of Eilat in the northern-eastern Red Sea near the city of Eilat in southern Israel swim in and out of.  It is a major tourist attraction in this area.

History
The Dolphin Reef opened its doors in 1990. The site is home to Black Sea bottlenose dolphins that are not trained to perform and there are no dolphin shows, but they are able to interact freely with human visitors. The dolphins, known for their curiosity and friendliness, approach the observation posts and floating piers, and swim alongside the people who snorkel and dive there.

The eastern side has a steeply sloping wall profile, giving way to a sandy slope. Many species of fish can be found in the area. Angelfish, butterflyfish, cuttlefish, bluespotted and blackspotted stingrays are common.

The Dolphin Reef Dive Center offers individual and group diving tours, as well as special therapy sessions for the disabled and seminars on animal and dolphin behavior.

See also
Tourism in Israel
Wildlife of Israel

References

External links
 www.dolphinreef.co.il (official website) 

Reefs of the Red Sea
Reefs of the Indian Ocean
Dolphinariums